Heteroturris is a genus of sea snails, marine gastropod mollusks in the family Borsoniidae

This genus was previously included in the subfamily Clathurellinae of the family Clavatulidae.

Species
Species within the genus Heteroturris include:
 Heteroturris gemmuloides Sysoev, 1997
 Heteroturris kanacospira Kantor, Fedosov & Puillandre, 2018
 Heteroturris serta Sysoev, 1997
 Heteroturris sola Powell, 1967

References

 Powell, Arthur William Baden,1967. The family Turridae in the Indo-Pacific. Part 1a: The subfamily Turrinae concluded.

External links
  Bouchet P., Kantor Yu.I., Sysoev A. & Puillandre N. (2011) A new operational classification of the Conoidea. Journal of Molluscan Studies 77: 273-308.